Shadow of the Beast may refer to:

Shadow of the Beast (1989 video game), developed by Reflections Interactive
Shadow of the Beast II, released in 1990
Shadow of the Beast III, released in 1992
Shadow of the Beast (2016 video game), developed by Heavy Spectrum Entertainment Labs